La Font Township is an inactive township in New Madrid County, in the U.S. state of Missouri.

La Font Township was established in 1899, and named after Robert Lafont, a local judge.

References

Townships in Missouri
Townships in New Madrid County, Missouri